Kwiatkówek  is a village in the administrative district of Gmina Góra Świętej Małgorzaty, within Łęczyca County, Łódź Voivodeship, in central Poland. 

There is an open-air museum in the village (a branch of the Museum of Archaeology and Ethnography in Łódź). Łęczyca Peasant Farm features a number of traditional wooden buildings, including a windmill dating back to 1820.

References

Villages in Łęczyca County